Myxilla fusca is a species of demosponge first found on the coast of New South Wales.

External links
WORMS

Poecilosclerida